Malynivka may refer to:
Malynivka, Kharkiv Oblast, an urban locality (an urban-type settlement) in Kharkiv Oblast, Ukraine
Malynivka, Chernivtsi Oblast, a rural locality in Chernivtsi Oblast, Ukraine

See also
Marynivka